National Route 481 is a national highway of Japan connecting Kansai International Airport and Izumisano, Osaka in Japan with a total length of 5.8 km (3.6 mi).

References

481
Roads in Osaka Prefecture